Bheemili Beach is located at the origin of the Gosthani River, at a distance of 24 km from Visakhapatnam in Visakhapatnam district of the Indian state of Andhra Pradesh. The beach reflects the British and Dutch settlements of the 17th century.

History 

The East India Company and Dutch East India Company both had trading ports here.

Transportation
APSRTC runs buses to this area; with these routes:

Tourism development 

Visakhapatnam Urban Development Authority is developing infrastructure for promotion of tourism at global level, such as a tourism facilities, improvements along the shore with beach park on Visakhapatnam−Bheemili beach road.

See also 
List of beaches in India

References 

Tourist attractions in Visakhapatnam
Geography of Visakhapatnam
Beaches of Andhra Pradesh
Geography of Visakhapatnam district
Uttarandhra